The 1303 Hongdong earthquake occurred in Yuan dynasty of the Mongol Empire, on September 25. The shock was estimated to have a moment magnitude of 7.6 and it had a maximum Mercalli intensity of XI (Extreme). This is one of the most fatal earthquakes in China, in turn making it one of the top disasters in China by death toll.

Geology 
Because of the time period in which it struck, very little is known about the nature of the earthquake. However, its epicentre was almost certainly located somewhere in what is now Shanxi (山西) province, near the present-day towns of Hongdong (洪洞) and Zhaocheng (赵城). The earthquake likely occurred on the Taigu fault zone in Shanxi, and several scarps and uplifts of local faults were seen as evidence of this; the Taigu fault zone has not experienced any measurable activity since the 1303 earthquake. The magnitude was calculated by modern seismologists to be 8.0 on the moment magnitude scale, though it is impossible to say for sure due to lack of accurate geological data.

Damage and casualties 
This is one of the deadliest earthquakes in China, in turn making it one of the top disasters in China by death toll.

In the nearby towns of Zhaocheng and Hongdong, every major temple and school building collapsed and over half the towns' populations perished. Every building in Huo county, Shanxi was destroyed. In Taiyuan and Pingyang, nearly 100,000 houses collapsed and over 200,000 people died from collapsing buildings and loess caves in a similar manner to the situation that would be experienced 253 years later in the 1556 Shaanxi earthquake (陕西). Cracks in the ground turned into miniature rivers, and many canals in Shanxi Province were destroyed, along with city walls. Some reports stated that the earthquake even levelled mountains and hills, altering the topographic makeup of the region. Landslides and soil subsidence and liquefaction triggered by the shaking were a likely root cause of these large-scale environmental changes. Rebuilding was generally slow, owing to the destroyed infrastructure of Shanxi and was interrupted by several other earthquakes in the following years.

The 1303 Hongdong earthquake, though currently the last to have occurred on its fault system, marked the start of a centuries-long episode of heightened earthquake activity throughout China, the first of several to occur up to the end of the twentieth century. It was also the first of many examples of earthquakes that demonstrated the tendency of earthquakes in China to strike near loess plateaus.

See also 
List of disasters in China by death toll
List of earthquakes in China
List of historical earthquakes

References

External links 
Ruins of the Hongdong Earthquake (1303) – Science Museums of China

Earthquakes in China
1303 in Asia
14th-century earthquakes
Disasters in Shaanxi
Disasters in Henan